Hariharan "Hari" Sreenivasan, born in 1974, is an American broadcast journalist.

Biography
Sreenivasan was born in Mumbai, India,  around 1974. After immigrating to the United States at age seven,  he attended Nathan Hale High School in Seattle, Washington. where he became a radio disc jockey.  While earning his degree in 1995 in mass communication (with minors in politics and philosophy) at University of Puget Sound, he interned for several TV news stations in the state of Washington. In September 2008, Sreenivasan became a U.S. citizen.

He was hired full-time in 1995 by then-NBC affiliate WNCN-TV in Raleigh, North Carolina, and later moved to San Francisco, California, to work for CNET, covering the high tech sector. In 2004, Sreenivasan joined ABC News in New York City as a correspondent, he became co-anchor, with Taina Hernandez, of World News Now, and concurrently co-hosted, with Jake Tapper, the behind-the-scenes podcast ABC News Shuffle. In early 2009, he worked as a correspondent for CBS News' Dallas bureau.

Late in 2009, he became an "online/on-air correspondent" for The NewsHour with Jim Lehrer, delivering the television broadcast's news-summary and end-of-the-hour recap and leading the show's blog.  In 2013, Sreenivasan became the anchor for the PBS NewsHour Weekend made at the Tisch WNET Studios at Lincoln Center in Manhattan. He regularly replaced the late correspondent Gwen Ifill and stands in for Judy Woodruff when she is away or on assignment.

Miss America 2014 Nina Davuluri and Sreenivasan hosted a talk given by Narendra Modi, the Prime Minister of India, on September 28, 2014, at Madison Square Garden in Midtown Manhattan, in front of an audience of over 18,000.  This was Modi's first visit to the United States since he had been
denied a visa in 2005.

Other PBS projects

Sreenivasan also anchors SciTech Now, a science program produced by WLIW 21, a WNET sister station and PBS affiliate on Long Island.  He is also a correspondent for Amanpour & Company, based out of the WNET studios in Manhattan.

See also
 Indians in the New York City metropolitan region
 New Yorkers in journalism
 PBS NewsHour

References

External links
 
 
 
Three Questions for Hari Sreenivasan from SAJAforum.org
 Profile from ABC Medianet
Profile from the South Asian Journalists Association
Article on rediff.com based on Sreenivasan's sulekha.com blog entry
Interview on JournalismJobs.com, August 2005
SciTech Now website
Hari Sreenivasan Joins PBS NewsHour November 23, 2009.

American television journalists
American television reporters and correspondents
ABC News people
PBS people
American male journalists
American writers of Indian descent
University of Puget Sound alumni
Writers from Seattle
Indian emigrants to the United States
People from Mumbai
American people of Indian Tamil descent
American Hindus
1974 births
Living people
21st-century American journalists